The Billboard Hot 100 is a chart that ranks the best-performing singles of the United States. Published by Billboard magazine, the data are compiled by Nielsen SoundScan based collectively on each single's weekly physical sales, and airplay. There were 18 number-one singles in 2000. The first of these, Santana's "Smooth", spent two weeks at the top in January, concluding a 12-week run that had begun in October 1999.

During the year, 10 acts each achieved a first U.S. number-one single, either as a lead artist or featured guest: Joe, 98 Degrees, Lonestar, The Product G&B, Aaliyah, Vertical Horizon, Matchbox Twenty, NSYNC, Sisqó, and Creed. Destiny's Child and Christina Aguilera were the only acts to have earned two number-one singles in this year. There were two collaboration singles that reached number-one on the chart: "Maria Maria" by Santana featuring The Product G&B, and "Thank God I Found You" by Mariah Carey featuring Joe and 98 Degrees. With the latter single, Carey set the record for most consecutive years charting a number-one single on the Billboard Hot 100 with 11 years from 1990 (beginning with "Vision of Love") through 2000, and became her 15th number-one single on the chart.

Destiny's Child's "Independent Women" is the second-longest-running single of 2000, topping the chart for 7 consecutive weeks, with another four consecutive weeks in the 2001 chart year. Santana's "Maria Maria" is the longest-running single, staying at number one for 10 straight weeks. Other singles with extended chart run include pop singer Madonna's "Music" and Christina Aguilera's "Come On Over Baby (All I Want Is You)", each of which topped the chart for four weeks.

Chart history

Number-one artists

See also
2000 in music
List of Billboard number-one singles

References

Additional sources
Fred Bronson's Billboard Book of Number 1 Hits, 5th Edition
Joel Whitburn's Top Pop Singles 1955-2008, 12 Edition
Joel Whitburn Presents the Billboard Hot 100 Charts: The 2000s
Additional information obtained can be verified within Billboard's online archive services and print editions of the magazine.

2000 record charts
2000